Lanouaille is a commune in the Dordogne department in Nouvelle-Aquitaine in southwestern France. The departmental road D704 (Sarlat-Limoges) passes through the town.

History
Lanouaille (la nouvelle - new) is a relatively new commune created from parts of the areas of Savignac-Lédrier and Dussac. It owes its development to its location on the road from Sarlat to Limoges via Saint Yrieix and Montignac (D704) and to its status as seat of the canton until 2015 (before 1801 Dussac was the seat of the canton).

Population

See also
Communes of the Dordogne department

References

Communes of Dordogne
Arrondissement of Nontron